Thomas Archer (1668–1743) was English architect and courtier.

Thomas Archer may also refer to:

Thomas Archer (MP for Warwickshire) (1619–1685), English soldier and politician
Thomas Archer, 1st Baron Archer (1695–1768), English politician and nobleman
Thomas Archer (actor) (died 1848), English actor
Thomas Archer (divine) (1554–1630?), English Anglican divine
Thomas Archer (MP for Lincoln) (fl. 1415–1417), English politician, Member of Parliament for the city Lincoln
Thomas Archer (American politician) (died 1870), American politician
Thomas Croxen Archer (1817–1885), English-born, Scotland-based botanist and museum director
Thomas Archer (pastoralist) (1823–1905), Scottish-born Australian pioneer pastoralist and Agent General of Queensland
Thomas Andrew Archer (1853–1905), English historian
Thomas Archer, character in Already Dead

See also
Archer family